The Universidad de San Felipe de Austria was the first public university in the Philippines.

The educational institution was established by royal decree on December 23, 1640, by Governor-General Sebastian Hurtado de Corcuera. It closed down in 1644.

References

 

Education in Intramuros
Boys' schools in the Philippines
History of the Philippines (1565–1898)
1640 establishments in the Philippines
1643 disestablishments in the Philippines
Defunct universities and colleges in the Philippines
Defunct schools in the Philippines
Educational institutions established in the 1640s
Defunct organizations based in the Philippines
Former buildings and structures in Manila